Anderson Louis Rush (1838–1879) was a state legislator in Arkansas. He represented Pulaski County in the Arkansas House of Representatives in 1868 and 1869. He was a Republican. He was one of the six African Americans who first served in the Arkansas House. He represented the 10th District.

See also
African-American officeholders during and following the Reconstruction era

References

Republican Party members of the Arkansas House of Representatives
1838 births
1879 deaths
Politicians from Pulaski County, Arkansas
African-American politicians during the Reconstruction Era
African-American state legislators in Arkansas